Goyo may refer to:

People
 Goyo (singer), member of Colombian hip hop group ChocQuibTown
Goyo Benito (b. 1946), Spanish footballer
Goyo Blasco (1909–1983), Spanish footballer
Goyo Fonseca (b. 1965), Spanish footballer
Goyō Hashiguchi (1880–1921), Japanese artist
Goyo Jiménez (b. 1970), Spanish comedian
Goyo Manzano (b. 1956), Spanish football manager
Goyo Montero (b. 1975), Spanish ballet dancer
Goyo Vargas (b. 1970), Mexican boxer
Dakota Goyo (b. 1999), Canadian actor
Gregorio Conrado Álvarez "El Goyo" (1925–2016), Uruguayan army general
Gregorio Cárdenas Hernández "Goyo" (1915–1999), Mexican serial killer
Gregorio Díaz Alfonso "Goyo" (1929–1996), Cuban rumba musician, co-founder of Los Muñequitos de Matanzas
Gregorio Hernández Ríos "El Goyo" (1936–2012), Cuban rumba musician
Gregorio Jiménez de la Cruz "Goyo" (1972–2014), Mexican journalist
Gregorio Sauceda-Gamboa "El Goyo" (b. 1965), Mexican drug trafficker
Gregory “Goyo” Fernando Pappas (b. 1960), American philosopher

Other uses
Don Goyo, also known as Popocatépetl, volcano in Mexico
Goyo FC, Mongolian football club
Goyo: The Boy General, 2018 Philippine historical epic film

See also
Gollo people